Saint-Tite-des-Caps is a municipality in La Côte-de-Beaupré Regional County Municipality in Quebec, Canada. The Sainte-Anne-du-Nord River forms the municipal western boundary.

The place is named after Titus, companion of Saint Paul, whereas "des-Caps" indicates its position within the Capes Region, that stretches from Cape Tourmente to Baie-Saint-Paul.

History
In 1853, the mission was founded, that became the Parish of Saint-Tite-des-Caps in 1876 when it separated from Saint-Joachim. In 1866, its post office opened. In 1872, the Municipality of Saint-Tite-des-Caps was incorporated.

Demographics
Population trend:
 Population in 2011: 1506 (2006 to 2011 population change: 4.6%)
 Population in 2006: 1440
 Population in 2001: 1426
 Population in 1996: 1522
 Population in 1991: 1523

Private dwellings occupied by usual residents: 656 (total dwellings: 814)

Mother tongue:
 English as first language: 0%
 French as first language: 100%
 English and French as first language: 0%
 Other as first language: 0%

List of mayors
Mayors of Saint-Tite-des-Caps since incorporation:

 Isaïe Ferland (1861-1862, 1873-1875, 1881-1882, 1885-1887)
 Hypolitte Dessers (1862-1863)
 Jean-Baptiste Jean (1863-1864)
 Éloi Boucher (1864-1866)
 Célestin Chevalier (1866-1868, 1872-1873)
 Onézime Leblond (1868-1872, 1875-1877)
 Alexandre Lavoie (1877-1878)
 Alfred Leclair (1878-1880)
 Napoléon Poulin (1880-1881)
 Édouard Girard (1882-1885, 1887-1890, 1891-1893)
 Jules Gagnon (1890-1891)
 Auguste Lavoie (1893-1897)
 Norbert Morency (1897-1914)
 Wilfrid Labranche (1914-1916)
 Ludger Leblond (1916-1917)
 Joseph Gauthier (1917-1921)
 Achille Lachance (1921-1931)
 David Morency (1931-1935, 1937-1944)
 Alfredo Leclerc (1935-1937)
 Télesphore Duclos (1944-1949)
 Ludger Duclos (1949-1958, 1964-1966)
 Noël Drouin (1958-1961)
 Albany Duclos (1961-1964)
 Paul-Eugène Morency (1966-1967)
 Roland Ferland (1967-1969)
 Jean-Noël Fortin (1969-1971)
 Paul Duchesne (1971-1975)
 Léopold Ferland (1975-1984)
 Huguette Filion Morency (1984-1987)
 Jean-Claude Clouet (1987-1998)
 Anne-Marie Guilbault (1998-2005)
 Pierre Dion (2005-2013)
 Majella Pichette (2013- )

See also
 La Côte-de-Beaupré Regional County Municipality
 Lombrette River
 Rivière des Chenaux
 Sainte-Anne River (Beaupré)
 List of municipalities in Quebec

References

External links

Incorporated places in Capitale-Nationale
Municipalities in Quebec